Jekyll and Hyde is a British TV fantasy drama based loosely on Robert Louis Stevenson's 1886 novella Strange Case of Dr Jekyll and Mr Hyde. Set in 1930s London and Ceylon, it follows the character of Dr. Robert Jekyll, a grandson of the Victorian Dr. Henry Jekyll, who has inherited his grandfather's split personality and violent alter-ego.

The series aired on ITV in the United Kingdom from 25 October to 27 December 2015 and it consisted of ten episodes. On 5 January 2016, creator Charlie Higson announced on Twitter that ITV had decided to pass on a second series.

Cast
Tom Bateman Dr. Robert Jekyll/Hyde, the grandson of the Victorian Dr. Henry Jekyll/Edward Hyde, the son of Louis, twin brother of Olalla.
Richard E. Grant Sir Roger Bulstrode, a British Intelligence officer studying supernatural phenomena
Tom Rhys Harries Mr Sackler, a sniper working for Sir Roger Bulstrode
Enzo Cilenti Captain Dance, senior officer for monster organisation, the Tenebrae.
Michael Karim Ravi Najaran, Vishal and Gurinder's son and Robert's foster-brother
Ace Bhatti Dr. Vishal Najaran, Gurinder's husband, Ravi's father and Robert Jekyll's foster-father in Ceylon. 
Lolita Chakrabarti Gurinder Najaran, Vishal's wife, Ravi's mother and Robert Jekyll's foster-mother in Ceylon. 
Natalie Gumede Isabella "Bella" Charming, the owner of an East End nightclub the Empire, and love interest of Robert's Hyde persona. 
Stephanie Hyam Lily Clarke Carew, a former biochemistry student of Cambridge, also, Lily Carew, granddaughter of the murdered Sir Danvers Carew.
Christian McKay Maxwell Utterson, Robert's estate lawyer whose father, Gabriel Utterson, worked for Dr. Henry Jekyll. 
Ruby Bentall  Hilary "Hils" Barnstaple, Maxwell's assistant.
Donald Sumpter Garson, once Henry Jekyll's assistant/footman, now the bartender of the Empire nightclub.
Sinéad Cusack  Maggie Hope. Lover of Victorian Dr. Henry Jekyll/Edward Hyde, mother of Louis and grandmother of Robert and Olalla.
Wallis Day Olalla Jekyll/Hyde, granddaughter of the Victorian Dr. Henry Jekyll/Edward Hyde, daughter of Louis and twin sister of Robert.
Amelia Bullmore Renata Jezequiel, a distant relative of the Jekyll family.
Natasha O'Keeffe Fedora, member of Tenebrae and love interest of Dance. 
Tony Way Cyclops Silas Parnell, member of Tenebrae, minion of Dance and leader of a gang of one-eyed thugs. 
Dee Tails The Harbinger, a creature. 
Phil McKee Mr Hannigan, an MIO agent working for Sir Roger Bulstrode.
Mark Bonnar Lord Protheroe, head of Daily Truth, harbourer of Fedora and the "killed" Dance.
David Bark-Jones and Thomas Coombes Dr. Henry Jekyll/Edward Hyde, Robert and Olalla 's grandfather and the father of Louis. .

Production
The series was based at 3 Mills Studios and also filmed in Kent – Rochester High Street doubles as the exterior of the Empire music hall and The Guildhall Museum features as the hotel where Dr. Jekyll (Tom Bateman) first lodges when arriving in England. The Historic Dockyard Chatham was used as location for the scenes used for Gravesend Docks, Tenebrae offices and factory and various areas of the site feature as London Streets and markets. Elmley Nature Reserve features in episode three as the setting for Maggie's (Niamh Walsh) country house and the Fort Amherst tunnels are used in episodes 9 and 10 where Jekyll finds out about the powers of The Incubus.

Episodes

Broadcast

Controversies
The opening episode attracted 459 complaints to the UK broadcasting regulator Ofcom in regard to the level of violence contained within a programme shown at 6.30pm.  Ofcom subsequently announced that it had launched an investigation., which ultimately ruled that the show had breached the Ofcom Broadcasting Code, as children were not "protected from unsuitable material by appropriate scheduling."

After the November 2015 Paris attacks, episode 4 was delayed for a week as it was felt that the subject matter would be upsetting with the fresh memories of the experience.

Cancellation 
On 5 January 2016, ITV confirmed that it would not be renewing Jekyll and Hyde for a second series. Reasons included poor and decreasing viewing figures, unfavourable comparisons to Doctor Who and public backlash following "hundreds of complaints" regarding the appropriateness of the content for a teatime family show.

Unmade second series
On 8 July 2016, Higson explained in a tweets thread what would have happened in Series 2: "We had lots of great stories already written for series 2 of Jekyll & Hyde. Robert was going to find out a lot more about his mother and find his father. He was going to reluctantly work for MIO. Robert & Ravi were going to return to Sri Lanka & uncover some buried secrets. Bella’s family history was going to come into play. There were going to be some shocking deaths and reversals. And we were going to find out a lot more about Lord Trash...  Instead, since ITV didn't want to make any more, they’re all dead!"

References

External links

2015 British television series debuts
2015 British television series endings
2010s British drama television series
British fantasy television series
Television series set in the 1930s
ITV television dramas
Television shows set in London
British supernatural television shows
Television series by ITV Studios
2010s British television miniseries
Television shows set in Sri Lanka
English-language television shows
Television series based on Strange Case of Dr Jekyll and Mr Hyde